Brett Cash (born 25 August 1979) is an Australian wrestler. He competed in the men's Greco-Roman 58 kg at the 2000 Summer Olympics.

References

External links
 

1979 births
Living people
Australian male sport wrestlers
Olympic wrestlers of Australia
Wrestlers at the 2000 Summer Olympics
Sportspeople from Sydney